Văscăuți is a commune in Florești District, Moldova. It is composed of three villages: Făgădău, Octeabriscoe, and Văscăuți.

References

Communes of Florești District
Soroksky Uyezd